Albert Mayer may refer to:

 Albert Mayer (canoeist) (born 1943), French sprint canoer
 Albert Mayer (planner) (1897–1981), American planner and architect
 Albert Mayer (soldier) (1892–1914), considered the first German soldier to die in World War I